24 Postcards in Full Colour is the 2008 album by neo-classical composer Max Richter, released on July 21, 2008 on 130701, an imprint of FatCat Records. The album was reissued on April 25, 2014 on Deutsche Grammophon.

Critical reception

24 Postcards in Full Colour received largely positive reviews from contemporary music critics.

Joe Tangari of Pitchfork Media gave the album a positive review, stating, "This is a frequently haunting album, though it sacrifices a great deal of flow in the name of brevity and variety. Even if no one ever downloads it to a Nokia, the hair-raising violin of "A Sudden Manhattan of the Mind" makes its point just fine as part of the album. And that's the most important thing to remember about this album: the concept is strong, but the music is stronger."

Track listing

Release history

References

2008 albums
Max Richter albums
FatCat Records albums